Ametastegia glabrata, known generally as the dock sawfly or dock false-worm, is a species of common sawfly in the family Tenthredinidae. It is found in Europe.

References

External links

 

Tenthredinidae
Articles created by Qbugbot